Insulin like 6 is a protein that in humans is encoded by the INSL6 gene.

Function

The protein encoded by this gene contains a classical signature of the insulin superfamily and is significantly similar to relaxin and relaxin-like factor. This gene is preferentially expressed in testis. Its expression in testis is restricted to interstitial cells surrounding seminiferous tubules, which suggests a role in sperm development and fertilization.

References

Further reading 

Human proteins